Manikanth Kadri  is an Indian film score, soundtrack composer and singer. He has predominantly scored music for Kannada as well as several Telugu, Tamil, Tulu, and Malayalam films.  He is the son of legendary saxophonist Kadri Gopalnath.

Career
Manikanth started out his career by composing for jingles and devotional albums. He also composed for a title track of a Malayalam tele-serial Annu Mazhayayirunnu and won the Kerala State Award for best music.

He released his first instrumental album called Dream Journey in the year 2001 and also tasted success. He also scored for background for an English feature film Tantric Journal.
  
His film musical career began with Smart City (Malayalam) and Mr. Garagasa (Kannada), at the age of 24. After these films, his major break through happened with the Kannada film Savari in 2009.  He has scored music for various films in Telugu, Malayalam, Kannada, Tulu and Tamil languages.

Discography

Television
 Station ID for COLORS SUPER Kannada
 Title song for CHAMPIONS COLORS SUPER kannada
 Title song for Super minute 2 Kannada for COLORS Kannada
 Title song for Sriman shrimati for ZEE Kannada
 Title song for DANCING STARS 2 COLORS kannada
 Title song for COLORS Anubandha Awards.
 Station ID for COLORS CINEMA kannada
 Title song for THAKADHIMITHA COLORS Kannada
 Title song for MAADESHWARA for ZEE Kannada
Title song for Lakshana for Colors Kannada

Awards
 2005 – Kerala State Television Award for Best Music- Annu Mazhayayirunnu
 2009 – Mirchi music awards for best song of the year and song of the year listeners choice and best female singer for "SAVARI"
 2010 – Best music director by Bangalore Music Academy  "PRITHVI"
 2014 – Zee Kannada awards for Ninna danigaagi song from savari 2 (Best lyrics, Best female singer and Best male singer)
 2014 – Six mirchi music awards for ninna danigagi song (Best composer of the year, best album of the year, song of the year, song of the year listeners choice, best lyrics, best technical award for mix n master) for Savari 2 
 2014 – best music director award from chithra sante for Savari 2 
 2014 – Red Fm tulu film awards for best music director (RANG)
 2014 – Red Fm tulu film awards for best background score (Chalipolilu)
 2017 – Best album of the year for RUN ANTONY
 2018 – TIMES KAFTA awards for best background score (March 22)

References

External links

Song audio links
 saavn -

Song video links
 ninna danigaagi from SAVARI 2 
 marali mareyagi from SAVARI 
 Shaakuntle Sikkalu from Naduve Antaravirali [https://www.youtube.com/watch?v=TKk-ZGY5Ik4

Living people
Kannada film score composers
Telugu film score composers
Tamil film score composers
Malayalam film score composers
Musicians from Mangalore
Film musicians from Karnataka
21st-century Indian composers
Year of birth missing (living people)